Kim Jong-pil (born March 9, 1992) is a South Korean football player who plays for Gyeongnam FC.

Club statistics
Updated to 23 February 2018.

References

External links

Profile at Tokushima Vortis

1992 births
Living people
Association football midfielders
South Korean footballers
South Korean expatriate footballers
J1 League players
J2 League players
Giravanz Kitakyushu players
Tokyo Verdy players
Shonan Bellmare players
Kim Jong-pil
Tokushima Vortis players
Gyeongnam FC players
Expatriate footballers in Japan
South Korean expatriate sportspeople in Japan
Expatriate footballers in Thailand
Footballers from Seoul